Spurius Postumius Albinus Paullulus was a politician of ancient Rome, of patrician rank, of the 2nd century BC.  He was praetor in Sicily in 183 BC, and consul in 174 BC.  He was probably a brother of Aulus Postumius Albinus Luscus and Lucius Postumius Albinus, and perhaps obtained the agnomen of "Paullulus" (Latin for "small" or "little") by being small of stature, to distinguish him more accurately from his two brothers.

See also 
 Postumia gens

References 

 

2nd-century BC Roman consuls
Spurius, Paullulus
Roman patricians
Roman Republican praetors